Binhai Shalun is a light rail station of the Danhai light rail, which is operated by New Taipei Metro. It is located in Tamsui District, New Taipei, Taiwan.

Station overview
The station is an at-grade station with an island platform. It is located at Binhai Road Section 2 near its intersection with Shalun Road Section 1.

Station layout

Around the station
 Gongqi Nature Park

References

2018 establishments in Taiwan
Railway stations opened in 2018
Danhai light rail stations